Oberea shibatai is a species of beetle in the family Cerambycidae. It was described by Masao Hayashi in 1962.

References

Beetles described in 1962
shibatai